Ko Lai-chak (born 10 May 1976 in Chancheng, Foshan, Guangdong, China) is a table tennis player from Hong Kong.

He won a silver medal at the 2004 Summer Olympics in the men's doubles alongside Li Ching. At the 2006 Asian Games he won two medals, a gold in the men's doubles again alongside Li Ching; and a bronze in the men's singles tournament and the men's team competition. He uses a penhold grip. In the 2008 Summer Olympics, he made it to the quarter-finals.

References

External links
 ITTF DATABASE

1976 births
Living people
Hong Kong male table tennis players
Olympic silver medalists for Hong Kong
Olympic table tennis players of Hong Kong
People from Foshan
Table tennis players at the 2004 Summer Olympics
Table tennis players at the 2008 Summer Olympics
People from Nanhai District
Place of birth missing (living people)
Olympic medalists in table tennis
Asian Games medalists in table tennis
Table tennis players at the 2010 Asian Games
Table tennis players at the 2006 Asian Games
Table tennis players at the 2002 Asian Games
Medalists at the 2004 Summer Olympics
Asian Games gold medalists for Hong Kong
Asian Games bronze medalists for Hong Kong
Medalists at the 2006 Asian Games
Table tennis players from Guangdong
Medalists at the 2002 Asian Games